Curtis Rae Hasselbring (born July 12, 1965,in Fort Wayne, Indiana) is an American jazz trombonist.

Hasselbring learned trombone and guitar while young, though he did not play guitar professionally until the 1990s. He studied formally at the New England Conservatory, graduating in 1988, then worked with Charlie Kohlhase and Ken Schaphorst. He took a master's degree at Rutgers in 1997, during which time he worked with Chris Speed, Bobby Previte, Cuong Vu, Satoko Fujii, and others. He is the leader of the ensembles The New Mellow Edwards, Decoupage, and Curha-chestra. He has released three albums as a leader.

Discography

As leader
 The New Mellow Edwards (Skirl, 2006)
 Big Choantza (Skirl, 2009)
 Number Stations (Cuneiform, 2013)

As sideman

With Either/Orchestra
 Radium (Accurate, 1988)
 The Half-Life of Desire (Accurate, 1990)
 The Calculus of Pleasure (Accurate, 1992)
 Across the Omniverse (Accurate, 1996)

With Satoko Fujii
 South Wind (Leo Lab, 1997)
 Double Take (EWE, 2000)
 Jo (Buzz, 2000)
 The Future of the Past (Enja, 2003)
 Blueprint (Natsat Music, 2004)
 Undulation (PJL, 2006)
 Fujin Raijin (Victo, 2007)
 Summer Suite (Libra, 2008)
 Watershed (Libra, 2011)
 Eto (Libra, 2011)
 Shiki (Libra, 2014)
 Fukushima (Libra, 2017)
 Entity (Libra, 2019)

With Ghost Train Orchestra
 Hothouse Stomp (Accurate, 2011)
 Book of Rhapsodies (Accurate, 2013)
 Book of Rhapsodies Vol. II (Accurate, 2017)

With Ken Schaphorst
 Making Lunch (Accurate, 1989)
 After Blue (Accurate, 1991)
 When the Moon Jumps (Accurate, 1994)
 Purple (Naxos, 1998)
 How to Say Goodbye (JCA, 2016)

With others
 George Adams, Where Were You? (GM, 1989)
 Beat Circus, Dreamland (Cuneiform 2008)
 Oren Bloedow & Jennifer Charles, La Mar Enfortuna (Tzadik, 2001)
 Benny Carter, Harlem Renaissance (MusicMasters 1992)
 Gogol Bordello, Super Taranta! (SideOneDummy, 2007)
 Golem, Fresh Off Boat (JDub, 2006)
 Golem, Tanz (Corason, 2014)
 Jerry Granelli, Enter, a Dragon (Songlines, 1998)
 Jerry Granelli, Crowd Theory (Songlines, 1999)
 Tom Harrell, Time's Mirror (RCA Victor, 1999)
 Chris Lightcap, Superette (Royal Potato Family 2018)
 Chris Lightcap, SuperBigmouth (Pyroclastic 2019)
 Frank London, Brotherhood of Brass (Piranha, 2002)
 Boban Markovic, Boban I Marko (Piranha, 2003)
 Medeski Martin & Wood, Notes from the Underground (Accurate, 1992)
 Eric Person, Thoughts On God (Distinction, 2012)
 Bobby Previte, Too Close to the Pole (Enja, 1996)
 Roberto Juan Rodriguez, Baila! Gitano Baila! (Tzadik, 2005)
 George Schuller, Jigsaw (482 Music, 2004)
 Gunther Schuller, Jumpin' in the Future (GM, 1988)
 Ron Sexsmith, Whereabouts (Interscope, 1999)
 She & Him, Classics (Columbia, 2014)
 Assif Tsahar, Embracing the Void (Hopscotch 2001)
 Matt Wilson, Humidity (Palmetto, 2003)

References

American jazz trombonists
Male trombonists
Musicians from Indiana
American male jazz musicians
Ghost Train Orchestra members
1965 births
Living people
Musicians from Fort Wayne, Indiana